Krishnan Bhaskar Pillai (born 27 February 1963) is a former Indian cricketer who was a prolific run scorer for Delhi and North Zone.

A right-handed batsman, he had particular success between 1983 and 1989 in the Ranji Trophy where he averaged about 70. Although he never got to play international cricket for India, he was once a standby for India's tour of Sri Lanka in 1985. He also once represented the Rest of India to play against Bombay at Nagpur and he scored a century in the second innings. In September 2016, he was appointed as Delhi senior team coach.

In August 2018, he was appointed as the coach of Uttarakhand cricket team.

References

External links
 

1963 births
Living people
Delhi cricketers
North Zone cricketers
Indian cricketers
Cricketers from Thiruvananthapuram